Brypoctia is a monotypic moth genus in the family Cossidae. Its only species, Brypoctia strigifer, is found in Mexico, Costa Rica, Honduras, Guatemala and Colombia.

References

Natural History Museum Lepidoptera generic names catalog

Zeuzerinae
Monotypic moth genera
Cossidae genera
Moths of North America
Moths of South America